Nebsenre (meaning "Their Lord is Ra") was an Egyptian pharaoh of the 14th Dynasty of Egypt during the Second Intermediate Period. Nebsenre reigned for a least five months over the Eastern and possibly Western Nile Delta, some time during the first half of the 17th century BCE. As such Nebsenre was a contemporary of the Memphis based 13th Dynasty.

Attestations

Historical source
The prenomen "Nebsenre" is preserved on the ninth column, 14th row of the Turin canon, a list of kings written during the reign of Ramses II (1279–1213 BCE) which serves as the primary historical source for the Second Intermediate Period. The canon further credits Nebsenre with a lost number of years, five months and 20 days of reign following Heribre on the throne. The prenomen of Nebsenre's successor is written as wsf on the Turin king list, indicating that his name was already lost in a lacuna of the document from which the canon was copied in Ramesside times.

Contemporary artefact
Nebsenre is one of only four kings of the 14th Dynasty to be attested by an artefact contemporary with his reign: a jar of unknown provenance bearing his prenomen, which was in the private Michailidis collection.

Chronological position
According to the Egyptologists Kim Ryholt and Darrell Baker, Nebsenre was the 14th king of the 14th Dynasty, a line of rulers of Canaanite descent reigning over the Eastern Nile Delta from c. 1700 BCE until c. 1650 BCE. Alternatively the Egyptologist Jürgen von Beckerath sees him as the fifteenth ruler, due to a differing reconstruction of the early 14th Dynasty.

Notes

References

Bibliography

 
 
 
 
 
 
 
 

17th-century BC Pharaohs
Pharaohs of the Fourteenth Dynasty of Egypt